Ivan Zelic (born 24 February 1978) is an Australian former international footballer and current writer, film-maker, and actor.

Club career

Ivan Zelic was born to Croatian parents and started to play football at the age of 7 for club side Canberra FC, a club known as a breeding ground for Australian Croatian footballing talent, with the likes of older brother, Australian international Ned Zelic, and Croatian international Josip Simunic also coming through the same ranks.

He won a scholarship at the illustrious Australian Institute of Sport (A.I.S) at the age of 16. It was here that Zelic was picked out by Sydney Olympic in the National Soccer League (NSL), Where he began to ply his trade in the professional league at the age of 17, cementing a spot as a defender in David Ratcliffe's side of 1995–96.

After two seasons, he then signed for Canberra Cosmos, and in his second year there was to become one of the National Soccer League's youngest-ever captains at the age of 21.

He then signed for Adelaide City on a two-year deal, eventually leaving halfway through the second season to join the Melbourne Knights.

After finishing the season, Zelic returned home to play for Canberra FC, being a stand out for the local side as a left sided midfielder as they won the minor premiership.

It was at his next NSL side, Sydney United, that Zelic suffered a Lisfranc fracture, which involved breaking two metatarsals and tearing the ligaments in his right foot whilst playing in Auckland against the Auckland Kingz in the NSL.

He was to eventually recover, and after a 9-month lay off through injury, signed for Malaysian club Johor FC, where he spent a season.

Upon returning to Australia, he signed for NSW premier league sides St. George Saints and Blacktown City Demons, and was in possibly the best form of his career, leading Blacktown to a minor premiership playing as an attacking left sided midfielder.

International career

Zelic was a regular of the Australian Under 20s, or Young Socceroos, starting 11 in the lead up to, and in the World Youth Cup, which was held in Malaysia in 1997.

After the World Youth Cup was over, he furthered his international career by becoming the captain of the Australian Olympic team or Olyroos in their lead-up to the Sydney 2000 Olympics but was to eventually fall out of favor with Australian Olympic team coach Raul Blanco.

Blanco eventually invited Zelic to be part of the Olympic squad for the 2000 Olympics in Sydney, but Zelic declined the offer in a storm of controversy, instead opting to concentrate on his club football with Adelaide City.

Acting career

Zelic has played guest starring roles in hit Australian shows such as All Saints, Home and Away and Packed to the Rafters.

In 2015, he played the lead role in "Colt 13", a short film directed by Luke A. McKay, which went on to play at numerous film festivals and which earned Zelic a best actor award at the Sydney Indie Film Festival.

Directing career

In 2008, Zelic wrote and directed his first short film, The Sin Bleeder, with cinematographer Marc Windon. Zelic's style in The Sin Bleeder became known for its long takes and smooth camera movements, the short film eventually going on to play at numerous short film festivals, as well as appearing at the Bondi Short Film Festival.

His follow-up, Ruthless Days, a gritty crime story, also went on to appear at a number of short film festivals across Australia, one of them being the Melbourne Underground Film Festival.

Personal life
Zelic is the younger brother of former Australian international footballer Ned Zelić and the older brother of former SBS football presenter Lucy Zelic.

References

External links
OzFootball profile

Ozfootball.net
Findarticles.com

If.comau
Badlit.com

Ruthless Days at the Internet Movie Database

1978 births
Living people
Australian soccer players
National Soccer League (Australia) players
Adelaide City FC players
Canberra Cosmos FC players
Melbourne Knights FC players
Sydney Olympic FC players
Sydney United 58 FC players
Australian people of Croatian descent
Association football defenders